ACPD is the chemical compound 1-Amino-1,3-dicarboxycyclopentane

It may also refer to:

Aguadilla City Police Department, Puerto Rico 
Albemarle County Police Department, Virginia, United States 
Allegheny County Police Department, Pennsylvania, United States 
Arlington County Police Department, Virginia, United States
Atlantic City Police Department, New Jersey, United States 
Al Arabia Cinema Production & Distribution, Egypt